All India Institute of Medical Sciences, Deoghar (AIIMS Deoghar) is a public medical school and hospital located in Deoghar, Jharkhand, India. It is also one of the All India Institutes of Medical Sciences (AIIMSs) that started operation in 2019. The Institute operates autonomously under the Ministry of Health and Family Welfare of Government of India under the Pradhan Mantri Swasthya Suraksha Yojna (PMSSY) and also among the Institutes of National Importance in India.

History
AIIMS Deoghar was set up as part of the Pradhan Mantri Swasthya Suraksha Yojana (PMSSY) initiative, announced by the Government of India in 2003 and officially launched in March 2006, for the purpose of "correcting regional imbalances in the availability of affordable/reliable tertiary healthcare services", through setting up AIIMS Delhi-like institutions and upgrading government medical colleges.

A proposal for setting an AIIMS in Jharkhand was first made by the local government in June 2016. In August, in response to a request by the union government to come up with several alternatives for the location, the local government announced that the preferred location is in Deoghar, although Ranchi was also considered. On 1 February 2017, in the budget presentation for 2017–2018, Minister of Finance Arun Jaitley officially announced the intent to establish an AIIMS in Jharkhand, as well as one in Gujarat. These were later denoted "Phase-VI" of PMSSY. A detailed project report was prepared in July and the site in Deoghar was finalised in December. The foundation stone was laid by Prime Minister Narendra Modi later that month. The  contract for building the institute was awarded to NBCC in October.

The institute became operational with the first batch of 50 MBBS students, which started in September 2019, one of the six AIIMSs to become operational in 2019. Saurabh Varshney was appointed director in March 2020 and N.K. Arora appointed president in May of that year. A second batch of 62 MBBS students enrolled in 2020. Outpatient department (OPD) services were launched in August 2021.

Campus

Construction of the permanent campus started from December 2019 and as of June 2022 PMSSY reported it is "85.5% complete". The campus is expected to be finished in August 2022. Temporarily, the institute occupies the campus of the Panchayat Training Institute (PTI) in Deoghar, where hostels and classes are arranged.

Hospital services 
The 40-room outpatient department was inaugurated by the Minister of Health and Family Welfare, Mansukh Mandaviya, on 24 August 2021, including a night shelter facility for the patients and attendants. Online registration facilities were launched on 3 September 2021. On July 12, 2022 the 250-bed in-patient department (IPD) and operation theatre were opened.

References

External links
 

Hospitals in Jharkhand
Medical colleges in Jharkhand
Educational institutions established in 2019
Hospitals established in 2019
2019 establishments in Jharkhand
Deoghar